Teratosaurus is a genus of rauisuchians known from the Triassic Stubensandstein (Löwenstein Formation - Norian stage) of Germany. It is estimated to be 6 meters (19.5 ft) long.

Discovery
 
In 1860, Sixt Friedrich Jakob von Kapff at the Heslacher Wand near Stuttgart discovered the upper jaw bone of a large reptile. The type specimen, which Hermann von Meyer declared to be distinct from Belodon, was described and named by the latter as the type species Teratosaurus suevicus. The generic name is derived from Greek τέρας, teras, "[ominous birth of a] monster" and sauros, "lizard". The specific name refers to Suevia. The holotype, BMNH 38646, was found in the Mittlerer Stubensandstein. It consists of a 245 millimetres long right maxilla with six large, up to five centimetres long, teeth, erroneously interpreted by Meyer as the left maxilla. It indicates a body length of about six metres.

Later authors, such as Kapff himself, von Huene, Osborn, and Edwin H. Colbert, incorrectly attributed postcrania of the sauropodomorph dinosaur Efraasia to this species or genus and, as a result, it was thought to be a representative of a presumed group of carnivorous Prosauropoda or, alternatively, a very primitive theropod. Following this lead, many popular books in the 20th century depicted "teratosaurs" as the earliest sort of large-bodied meat-eating dinosaur, walking on two legs and preying on the prosauropods of its day. It was thought by many to be a Triassic ancestor to the "carnosaurs" of the Jurassic. Sauropodomorph material was described as Teratosaurus species such as Teratosaurus minor (now Efraasia) and Teratosaurus trossingensis.

In 1985 and 1986, Peter Galton and Michael Benton independently showed that Teratosaurus is actually a rauisuchian, a type of nondinosaurian large predatory archosaur, walking on all fours, which lived alongside dinosaurs during the Late Triassic.

Apart from the holotype and the sauropodomorph fossils, also some teeth probably belonging to various carnivorous archosaurs were named as Teratosaurus species. These included Teratosaurus lloydi, a renaming of Cladeiodon lloydi Owen 1841 by Huene in 1908, and Teratosaurus bengalensis. Teratosaurus silesiacus, described in 2005 by Tomasz Sulej on the basis of a left maxilla, was transferred to the genus Polonosuchus by Brussatte et al. in 2009.

References

 On the Classification of the Dinosauria with Observations on the Dinosauria of the Trias - Quarterly Journal of the Geological Society (1870) Scientific Memoirs III

External links

 Palaeos Mesozoic - Norian
 Rauisuchia Translation and Pronunciation Guide by Ben Creisler

Rauisuchids
Late Triassic reptiles of Europe
Fossil taxa described in 1861
Prehistoric pseudosuchian genera